{{Speciesbox
| taxon = Belobranchus segura
| authority = Keith, Hadiaty & Lord, 2012<ref name = CoF>{{Cof record|spid=72690|title='Belobranchus segura|access-date=24 July 2018}}</ref>
}}Belobranchus segura'' is a species of eleotrid sleeper goby which has been found in Indonesia on Halmahera, in Papua Barat and also on the Solomon Islands. It is an anadromous species in which the eggs are laid over rocky and gravel bottoms in freshwater streams. The free-swimming larvae then drift downstream to the sea where they undergo a planktonic stage before migrating up streams to mature and breed. It feeds on small crustaceans and fish.  The specific name honours the French hydrobiologist Gilles Segura for his contribution to the study of fish faunas.

References

Eleotridae
Taxa named by Philippe Keith
Taxa named by Renny Kurnia Hadiaty
Taxa named by Clara Lord
Fish described in 2012